Richard Salomon may refer to:

 Richard E. Salomon, vice-chairman of the Council on Foreign Relations
 Richard G. Salomon (1884–1966), historian of eastern European medieval history
 Richard G. Salomon (professor of Asian studies), University of Washington professor

See also
 Rick Salomon, American poker player